Norco is a 2022 point-and-click adventure game developed by Geography of Robots and published by Raw Fury. It released for macOS and Windows in May and for PlayStation 4, PlayStation 5, Xbox One, and Xbox Series X in November. The game takes place in an alternate version of Norco, Louisiana, and follows Kay, a woman who has returned home after her mother's death. Norco received several award nominations.

Premise and setting
The game is set in an alternate version of Norco, a town in Louisiana, and in other portions of the state around New Orleans. The game follows Kay, a woman who has returned to Norco after her mother's death. The game's developer goes by a pseudonym, Yuts, derived from a nickname for his grandfather. Yuts spent his childhood and some of his later life in Norco. Growing up, Yuts was "frightened yet transfixed" by the landscape in and around Norco, which has been shaped by the petroleum industry and hosts a major Shell facility which has twice experienced catastrophic explosions.

Development and release

The game grew out of a multimedia documentary work by Yuts and a friend, started in 2015. The work incorporated writing, interviews, and audio-visual components, focused on the impact of Hurricane Katrina on Louisiana and its landscape. In addition to Yuts, members of the development team, Geography of Robots, include Yuts' sister, Aaron Gray, Jesse Jacobi, and pseudonymous musicians fmAura and Gewgawly I. Part of the multimedia project was a side-scrolling game in which a robot attempts to enter a refinery in Norco; this game became Norco, and the earliest version of the current game was created in 2016. Yuts and Geography of Robots designed the game in the pixel art style. Yuts relied on internet research to teach himself how to create the illustrations he contributed to the game.

Gewgawly I was Yuts' original collaborator. Gewgawly I and fmAura worked to design the game's soundtrack, attempting to "capture the... mood and ambience" of the River Parishes. The game incorporates field recordings by a friend of the development team, Matt Carney, taken around Baton Rouge.

Raw Fury signed to publish the game in 2020. Yuts has said Norco will be the first game in a trilogy. Geography of Robots announced in September 2022 that the game would become available on consoles on 20 October 2022.

Influences
Direct influences on Norco include the games Déjà Vu and Snatcher. Yuts was also influenced by the fictional city Midgar from the Final Fantasy series. He has said Midgar, a highly stratified city controlled by a power company, gave him a "framework for understanding how both industry and industrial disaster [sic] are distributed across society". Yuts, who previously worked for the city of New Orleans doing GIS work, has cited Mike Davis as an influence. Davis, a Marxist scholar and critical geographer, often writes about the intersection between environmental and social issues.

Reception

The game received positive reviews from critics. According to review aggregator Metacritic, the game received "generally favorable reviews".

The game's art received praise. Kyle LeClair wrote that the art was "impressive" especially the "variety of detail". Noelle Warner, in an article published by Destructoid, wrote that the game's "visuals [were] often gorgeous" and noted that they could look "ugly and grotesque" in a way that helped convey the game's message. Warner further wrote that the "risks" the game took with its art "worked in its favor".

As with the game's art, critics emphasized the quality of NORCOs writing. Writing for The Gamer, Khee Hoon Chan referred to the writing as "impeccable" and "accentuat[ed]" by sudden turns in the narrative. In a review for Kotaku, John Walker echoed this sentiment, praising the writing as the portion of the game that "shines the brightest...embracing that magical realism theme, often poetic, yet stark and pessimistic".

Critics have compared Norco to Disco Elysium, a role-playing video game, and Kentucky Route Zero, a point-and-click adventure game. Chris Tapsell, in a review written for Eurogamer criticized Norco as "overwritten, in places, in the same way Kentucky Route Zero or Disco Elysium could be". Writing for Vice, Cameron Kunzelman praised the game as having also achieved the "great accomplishment" of Kentucky Route Zero and Disco Elysium: their creation of "lived-in worlds where people tried to make do". 

Yuts views comparisons to between Norco and Kentucky Route Zero as fair, but has said that he sees Norco "as very different mechanically, thematically". Alexis Ong, writing for PC Gamer, grouped Norco, Kentucky Route Zero, and Night in the Woods in a "small but vital group of hyperlocal narrative-driven point-and-click games" which emphasize economic concerns. Ong faulted critics and players for hastily comparing the games and failing to "[cultivate] better ways to talk about this sub-genre".

Awards
Norco won the inaugural Tribeca Games Award at the 2021 Tribeca Film Festival. Polygon and The New Yorker included Norco on their lists of the best games of 2022.

References

2022 video games
Indie video games
MacOS games
PlayStation 4 games
PlayStation 5 games
Point-and-click adventure games
Raw Fury games
Single-player video games
Southern Gothic media
Video games set in Louisiana
Video games developed in the United States
Xbox One games
Xbox Series X and Series S games
Windows games